Industry was  the largest single sector in Argentina's economy, with a 20.3% share of GDP. Well-integrated into local agriculture, half of the industrial exports have rural origin.

With a 6.5% production growth rate , the diversified manufacturing sector is organized around a steadily growing network of industrial parks (314 )

History

Between the 1850s and 1870s Argentina's exports of wool resulted in a period of economic boom, which was disrupted by periods of recession in wool markets first in 1866 and more severely in 1873. After 1873 tariffs were put in place to protect local industries. The manufacture of shoes and furniture was not mechanized and local industry was unable to compete with either the high quality goods imported from Europe, or the least expensive goods produced in mechanized factories in the United States.

Faced with the prospect of default as foreign capital dried up during the recessionary period, the Argentinian president Nicolás Avellaneda chose to implement economic reforms by abandoning the gold standard and increasing duties on imported goods leading to a period of import substitution.

As immigration to Argentina increased demand followed. By 1875 Argentina had become a center of British overseas investment. 12 per cent of British capital in Latin America went to Argentina ranking fourth behind Mexico, Brazil and Peru. By 1890 Argentina was first, receiving double what Britain invested in Brazil and Mexico at 35 per cent.

Sectors
Between 1877 and 1916 large firms were involved with the following industries and goods: chocolate, jam, coffee, biscuits, shoes, glass, paper, textiles, burlap bags, metallurgy, hats, leather. There were also several tanneries in operation during those years. Cigarettes were produced by Nobleza Piccardo, known today as British American Tobacco.

Beer and breweries were a growing industry in the late 19th century when Emilio Bieckert, a descendant of a beer producing family located near Strasbourg, arrived in Buenos Aires. By 1860 Bieckert was brewing light, golden beer from barley. His initial humble efforts gained him recognition and in Germany his award-winning beer was  likened to Pilsner. He also opened the first ice factory in Argentina. In 1864 Melville Sewell Bagley began making an orange peel liquor called Hesperidina.

Three chocolate factories introduced steam-powered production in the 1880s, spurred on by growing aggregate demand, protectionist tariffs and the post-colonial tastes. One confectionary, operated by a Basque businessman, began by selling imported and locally crafted sweets, but later implemented mechanized manufacturing processes to produce wholesale quantities of a single product, a Catalan jellied quince known as dulce de membrillo.

 the leading sectors by volume were: food processing, beverages and tobacco products; motor vehicles and auto parts; textiles and leather; refinery products and biodiesel; chemicals and pharmaceuticals; steel, aluminum and iron; industrial and farm machinery; home appliances and furniture; plastics and tires; glass and cement; and recording and print media. In addition, Argentina has since long been one of the top five wine-producing countries in the world.

Industrial centers
Córdoba is Argentina's major industrial center, hosting metalworking, motor vehicle and auto parts manufactures. Next in importance are the Greater Buenos Aires area (food processing, metallurgy, motor vehicles and auto parts, chemicals and petrochemicals, consumer durables, textiles and printing); Rosario (food processing, metallurgy, farm machinery, oil refining, chemicals, and tanning); San Miguel de Tucumán (sugar refining); San Lorenzo (chemicals and pharmaceuticals); San Nicolás de los Arroyos (steel milling and metallurgy); and Ushuaia and Bahía Blanca (oil refining).
Other manufacturing enterprises are located in the provinces of Santa Fe (zinc and copper smelting, and flour milling); Mendoza and Neuquén (wineries and fruit processing); Chaco (textiles and sawmills); and Santa Cruz, Salta and Chubut (oil refining)

See also
 Agriculture in Argentina

References

External links

Ministerio de Industria